Sara McLanahan (born Smith; 27 December 194031 December 2021) was an American sociologist. She is known for her work on the family as a major institution in the American stratification system. Her early work examined the consequences of divorce and remarriage for parents and children, and her later work focused on families formed by unmarried parents. She was interested in the effects of family structure on social inequality and the roles that public policies can play in addressing the needs of families and children.

Early life and education
Sara Frances Smith was born on 27 December 1940 in Tyler, Texas. After graduating from Bennet Junior College in 1959 with highest honors, McLanahan attended Smith College from 1961 to 1962. She married Ellery McLanahan in 1962. They divorced in 1972.

She  continued her education at the University of Houston where she received an undergraduate degree in sociology. She went on to earn her PhD in sociology from the University of Texas at Austin while a single parent to her children. McLanahan then completed a postdoctoral fellowship at the department of psychiatry at the University of Wisconsin

Career
McLanahan was the William S. Tod Professor of Sociology and Public Affairs at Princeton University. She previously taught at the University of Wisconsin.

At Princeton, McLanahan was the founding director of the Bendheim-Thoman Center for Research on Child Wellbeing, a principal investigator of the Fragile Families and Child Wellbeing Study, director of the Education Research Section, and director of the Joint Degree Program in Social Policy.

McLanahan was editor-in-chief of the journal The Future of Children and a trustee of the Russell Sage Foundation. She served as president of the Population Association of America in 2004, was elected a fellow of the American Academy of Political and Social Science in 2005, and, in 2011, was elected to the National Academy of Sciences. She was elected a member of the American Philosophical Society in 2016.

McLanahan published more than 125 research articles, 59 book chapters, and 7 books and edited volumes. More than 915 articles have been published which rely on data from the Fragile Families and Child Wellbeing Study, which she co-founded.

McLanahan died of lung cancer on 31 December 2021 at her residence in Manhattan, New York.

Honors and awards
She was elected as an American Academy of Arts and Sciences Fellow in 2019.

Selected works

References

External links
 Personal Webpage
 Faculty Webpage

1940 births
2021 deaths
21st-century American women
American sociologists
American women sociologists
Fellows of the American Academy of Arts and Sciences
Members of the American Philosophical Society
Members of the United States National Academy of Sciences
Princeton University faculty
University of Houston alumni
University of Texas at Austin College of Liberal Arts alumni
University of Wisconsin–Madison faculty
People from Tyler, Texas